Pontefract Racecourse is a thoroughbred horse racing venue located in Pontefract, West Yorkshire, England.

Layout

The track is left-handed undulating course with a sharp bend into the home straight.  Horses drawn low (i.e. on the inside of the track) usually have the advantage.  The final 3 furlongs of the track are uphill, making it quite testing.

The course was originally a horseshoe of 1 1/2 miles, but in 1983, it was converted into a full circuit of about 2 miles.  This made it one of the longest continuous flat racing circuits in Europe and allowed it to stage one of the longest races in the calendar at 2 miles 5 furlongs 133 yards.

History

Racing is recorded as having taken place in Pontefract as early as 1648, just before the local Castle was taken by the forces of Oliver Cromwell.  Races were held in the meadows near the town but these were discontinued by 1769.  The townsfolk restarted the sport in 1801 and it has continued ever since.  In 1827 the races were held in September and reported as being very fashionably attended.

While it cannot "claim to be one of Yorkshire's major courses" it was used for some major races during World War II when other courses were out of action.  These included the war substitute Lincoln and November Handicaps.

Pontefract installed a photo finish in 1952 and was also the first English course to have a dope testing facility.

The course traditionally began its afternoon race meetings at 2.45 pm - later than most other courses - so that miners at the adjacent colliery could finish the morning shift in time to go racing.  This remained the case until the colliery closed in 2002.

Facts and figures

Flat

Number of fixtures (2012) - 15
Prize money (2012) - £731,810
Top trainer (2007 - 2011 inc.) - Richard Fahey, 28 wins from 213 races

Notable races

References

Bibliography

External links

Official website
Course guide on GG.COM
Course guide on At The Races

 
Horse racing venues in England
Sport in the City of Wakefield
Sports venues in West Yorkshire
Pontefract